Abu'l-Abbas ibn Ja'far ibn al-Furat was the son of the powerful Ikhshidid vizier Ja'far ibn al-Furat. He was in turn appointed vizier by the Fatimid caliph al-Hakim (r. 996–1021) in 1014/5, but executed after a few days.

References

Sources
 
 

10th-century births
1014 deaths
11th-century Arabs
Abu'l-Abbas
Viziers of the Fatimid Caliphate
People executed by the Fatimid Caliphate
11th-century people from the Fatimid Caliphate